Robert Vans Agnew (4 March 1817 – 26 September 1893) was a Scottish Conservative Party politician.

At the 1868 general election he unsuccessfully contested the Wigtown Burghs.

Vans Agnew was elected as the Member of Parliament (MP) for Wigtownshire at a by-election in February 1873, filling the vacancy caused by Lord Garlies succeeding to the peerage as 10th Earl of Galloway . He was re-elected in 1874, and held the seat until he stood down at the 1880 general election.

Historical works
Vans Agnew edited the correspondence of his ancestor Patrick Vans, Lord Barnbarroch for publication in two volumes in 1887.
Correspondence of Sir Patrick Waus of Barnbarroch, knight, volume 1
Correspondence of Sir Patrick Waus of Barnbarroch, knight, volume 2

References

External links 
 

1817 births
1893 deaths
Scottish Tory MPs (pre-1912)
Members of the Parliament of the United Kingdom for Scottish constituencies
UK MPs 1868–1874
UK MPs 1874–1880